Cyperus sanguineoater is a species of sedge that is native to Central America, occurring in Mexico and Guatemala.

The species was first formally described by the botanist Johann Otto Boeckeler in 1881.

See also 
 List of Cyperus species

References 

sanguineoater
Taxa named by Johann Otto Boeckeler
Plants described in 1881
Flora of Mexico
Flora of Guatemala